Endara is a surname. Notable people with the surname include:

 Guido J. Martinelli Endara, Panamanian businessman
 Guillermo Endara (1936–2009), Panamanian politician
 Iván Endara (born 1988), Ecuadorian tennis player